Henry Falconer (born 22 December 1954) is an English former professional footballer who played in the Football League as a defender.

References

1954 births
Living people
Footballers from Newcastle upon Tyne
English footballers
Association football defenders
AFC Bournemouth players
Wimbledon F.C. players
English Football League players